During the 1999–2000 English football season, Brentford competed in the Football League Second Division. After returning to the Second Division as Third Division champions, a forgettable season ended in a 17th-place finish.

Season summary

Brentford entered the 1999–2000 Second Division season with the bulk of the squad which finished the 1998–99 season as Third Division champions. Four fringe players were released and the trio of Darren Freeman, Charlie Oatway and Paul Watson were sold to Brighton & Hove Albion for a combined £30,000 fee. Just four players were brought in – three youngsters on free transfers (Richard Kennedy, Stephen Jenkins and David Theobald) and another youngster on a season-long loan, Southampton's Phil Warner.

The Bees enjoyed a 10-match unbeaten start to the season in the Second Division, hovering in the playoff places and setting a new club record of 26 league matches without a defeat, which stretched back into the previous season. The run came to an end with the team's first league defeat of the season at the hands of Gillingham on 19 October 1999. Days earlier, centre back Hermann Hreiðarsson had been sold for a club-record £2,500,000 fee to Wimbledon, which weakened the defence. The backline was shored up with two big-money signings, £250,000 Scott Marshall and £150,000 Ívar Ingimarsson.

The season began to drift away from Brentford in November 1999, with injuries causing a run of eight defeats in 10 games. The League Cup and FA Cup had been exited in the first rounds and the club were knocked out of the Football League Trophy at the semi-final stage in February 2000. £100,000 was spent on new forwards Julian Charles and Lorenzo Pinamonte either side of the Millennium, neither of whom made an impact. Brentford closed out the season with just one win in 17 matches in all competitions to finish in a disappointing 17th place.

One record was set during the season, that of the shortest Football League career with Brentford, when trainee Clement James made a substitute appearance of 8 minutes on his debut versus Stoke City on 8 April 2000.

Final league table

Results
Brentford's goal tally listed first.

Legend

Pre-season and friendlies

Football League Second Division

FA Cup

League Cup

Football League Trophy

 Sources: Soccerbase, 11v11, The Big Brentford Book of the Nineties

Playing squad 
Players' ages are as of the opening day of the 1999–2000 season.

 Source: Soccerbase

Coaching staff

Statistics

Appearances and goals
Substitute appearances in brackets.

 Players listed in italics left the club mid-season.
 Source: Soccerbase

Goalscorers 

 Players listed in italics left the club mid-season.
 Source: Soccerbase

Discipline

 Players listed in italics left the club mid-season.
 Source: Soccerbase

International caps 

 Players listed in italics left the club mid-season.

Management

Summary

Transfers & loans

Kit

|
|

Awards 

 Supporters' Player of the Year: Martin Rowlands

References 

Brentford F.C. seasons
Brentford F.C.